Happiness Ahead is a 1934 American comedy film directed by Mervyn LeRoy and starring Dick Powell with Josephine Hutchinson. This was Hutchinson's (credited) debut.

Plot
Joan Bradford is a society heiress who rebels against her mother's choice of a future husband by masquerading as a working-class girl and dating a window washer.

Cast
 Dick Powell as Bob Lane
 Josephine Hutchinson as Joan Bradford
 John Halliday as Henry Bradford 
 Frank McHugh as Tom 
 Allen Jenkins as Chuck 
 Ruth Donnelly as Anna 
 Dorothy Dare as Josie
 Marjorie Gateson as Mrs. Bradford
 Gavin Gordon as "Jellie" Travis
 Russell Hicks as Jim Meehan
 Mary Forbes as Mrs. Travis
 J. M. Kerrigan as The Boss
 Mary Treen as The Girl
 Mary Russell as Girl
 Jane Darwell as Landlady
 George Chandler as Window Washer (uncredited)

Reception
Andre Sennwald, critic for The New York Times, called it "a winning and agreeable film", though he also described it as a "rather ordinary little romance".

Preservation status
The film is preserved in the Library of Congress Packard Campus for Audio-Visual Conservation collection.

References

External links 

 WB Shop - dvd made-on-demand availability

1934 films
Films directed by Mervyn LeRoy
1934 romantic comedy films
American romantic comedy films
American black-and-white films
Warner Bros. films
1930s English-language films
1930s American films